Boy Friend is a 1961 Hindi-language romantic comedy film directed by Naresh Saigal. The film stars Shammi Kapoor, Madhubala, Dharmendra in lead roles. The film's music is composed by Shankar-Jaikishan. It revolves around Madan, who ran away from his house as a child and becomes a thief.

This film was a remake of India's first blockbuster Kismet (1943), starring Ashok Kumar along with Mumtaz Shanti, Shah Nawaz and Mehmood. Boy Friend performed moderately well the box office.

Plot
Eight-year-old Madan is separated from his wealthy parents, Thakur Harcharan Singh (Shivraj) and his wife Rajni. Their other son, Madan's younger brother, Sunil (Dharmendra) grows up to become a police inspector and is searching for his lost brother Madan.

Madan (Shammi Kapoor), who now is known by the name Shyam, has managed to survive by becoming a petty thief and has ended up in jail. On his release, he boards a train to Mumbai, where he meets Shantilal, a man he had known earlier in jail. The man, who is old and ill, asks Shyam to find his two daughters, Sangita and Sushma, whom he had abandoned due to poverty and debt years before.

When Shyam arrives in Mumbai, he begins searching for the sisters. He soon finds a young woman named Sushma (Nishi Kohli). When she drives off, he follows her in a taxi to a theater owned by Harcharan Singh, who arrives with his wife.

Sushma's elder sister Sangeeta (Madhubala) is practicing dance for her stage debut in a play called "Boy Friend." The problem is that the play does not have a male lead.

While they are at the theater, Mrs. Singh's necklace is stolen by someone in the crowd. Inspector Sunil has just arrived with his men, and they start chasing the thief. Shyam sees the thief hide the necklace in a case in the sisters' car. That evening, Shyam sneaks into the sisters' house and retrieves the stolen necklace from the case. He also meets Sangita. When he relays their father's message to them, the sisters invite him to stay with them.

Shyam leaves early the next morning to return the stolen necklace to Sunil. But the Singhs' servant Sampat (Dhumal) steals the necklace from him and sells the necklace to a dealer.

Shyam, deciding to leave the life of crime and seek a job, sees the ad for a hero opposite Sangita in "Boy Friend" and goes to audition in front of Harcharan Singh. He is hired and the show opens in Shimla with great success. When he takes Sangita skiing, she breaks her leg - an operation is expensive, and she cannot appear on stage any longer. Harcharan sends his manager to demand that the sisters pay off their debt to him or lose their house. Shyam is furious at this, and quits his job as hero for the theater company. Without a job, the problem is finding the money that Sangita needs desperately, without resorting to his old thieving ways.

Cast
 Shammi Kapoor as Madan / Shyam
 Madhubala as Sangeeta
 Dharmendra as Inspector Sunil
 Nishi Kohli as Sushma
 Dhumal as Sampat
 Marutirao Parab as Sevakram 		
 Amirbai Karnataki as Rajni Singh
 Shivraj as Thakur Harcharan Singh

Soundtrack

Box office 
Boy Friend was the twentieth highest-grossing Indian film of 1961. It grossed ₹0.52 crore, including a nett of ₹0.26 crore. Adjusted for inflation, its gross was equivalent to ₹58.2 crore in 2016.

Trivia
 Amirbai Karnataki, who plays the role of Shammi Kapoor's mother in the film, had sung the songs of film's original version Kismet.
 While shooting for a song, Madhubala was so fascinated by Kapoor's dance that she would keep one eye open as he serenaded her (she was supposed to be asleep in the sequence). When he chided her for distracting him, she had said, 'I can't help it Shammi, I am fascinated by what you are doing... ;the way you are enacting the song. Where do you learn all this?' He had laughed it away.
 Kapoor had worked with Madhubala a decade ago in Rail Ka Dibba (1953), and she used to tease him for being underweight on the sets of the film. When they met once again for Boy Friend's shooting in the 60s, the first thing she had said to him was, '...you look so-so... Fat!'. He had recalled this incident in an interview taken in late 2010s.

References

External links 
 

1961 films
1960s Hindi-language films
Films scored by Shankar–Jaikishan
Remakes of Indian films